Bob de Voogd (born 16 September 1988) is a Dutch field hockey player who plays as a midfielder or forward for Belgian club Braxgata.

He was included to the national team in 2009 and won a silver medal at the 2012 Olympics, placing fourth in 2016.

Club career
De Voogd started playing hockey at his local hockey club HMHC in Helmond. After the club merged with another Helmond club he started playing for the newly formed club, HC Helmond. He played there until 2004 when he transferred to Den Bosch to play in the highest division of Dutch field hockey. In 2007 he transferred to Oranje Zwart. After Oranje Zwart merged in 2016 with EMHC he started playing for the newly formed club HC Oranje-Rood. In January 2019, he agreed to play for Braxgata in Belgium from the 2019–20 season onwards.

International career
De Voogd broke his jaw during a friendly match against Pakistan in June 2012, but recovered for the 2012 Olympics. Next year he missed four months of competitions, including the European Championships, because of a foot injury. He was not selected for the 2014 World Championships. However, he did play in the 2018 World Cup, where they won the silver medal. In January 2020 he was dropped from the national team's training squad for the 2020 Summer Olympics.

Honours

Netherlands
Olympic Silver Medal: 2012
European Championship: 2015, 2017
Hockey World League: 2012–13
Oranje Zwart
Euro Hockey League: 2014–15
Hoofdklasse: 2013–14, 2014–15, 2015–16

References

External links
 

1988 births
Living people
Sportspeople from Helmond
Dutch male field hockey players
Male field hockey midfielders
Male field hockey forwards
Field hockey players at the 2012 Summer Olympics
Field hockey players at the 2016 Summer Olympics
2018 Men's Hockey World Cup players
Olympic field hockey players of the Netherlands
Olympic silver medalists for the Netherlands
Olympic medalists in field hockey
Medalists at the 2012 Summer Olympics
HC Den Bosch players
Oranje Zwart players
HC Oranje-Rood players
Men's Hoofdklasse Hockey players
Men's Belgian Hockey League players
Expatriate field hockey players
Dutch expatriate sportspeople in Belgium
20th-century Dutch people
21st-century Dutch people